UTC−12:00 is an identifier for a time offset from UTC of −12:00. It is the last to enter a New Year, and is sometimes referred to as the International Date Line West time zone (IDLW).

As standard time (year-round)

Oceania
United States
United States Minor Outlying Islands
Baker Island and Howland Island (uninhabited islands belonging to the United States)

UTC−12:00 is a nautical time zone comprising the high seas between 180° and 172°30′W longitude, and the time is obtained by subtracting twelve hours from UTC.

Characteristics of  UTC−12:00
A number of inhabited territories lie within the longitudinal limits of this time zone (Tonga, Wallis and Futuna and Chatham Islands as well as parts of Chukotka Autonomous Okrug of Russia, the US state of Alaska, Fiji, Tokelau and Samoa) but none of them keeps the date and time of UTC−12:00. Instead, they keep the time and date (or just the date) of one of the neighboring zones, usually because they belong, politically, to a country which lies mostly in the neighboring time zone.

Since the International Date Line West (IDLW) time zone represents the last place on Earth where a particular time and/or date exists, it is referred to as Anywhere on Earth (AoE). A deadline specified as "Anywhere on Earth" has not passed if, anywhere on Earth, the deadline has not passed, or, equivalently, if the deadline has not passed in the UTC–12:00 zone.

The IDLW is also used in software testing for time zone related code that uses system default time zone, as in some cases they may be the same as on the developer's computer. Since the area of the IDLW has no programmers or data centers, there is no conflict.

See also
Greenwich Mean Time
Howland and Baker islands
UTC+12:00
UTC+14:00
Anywhere on Earth

References

External links

UTC offsets
United States Minor Outlying Islands

es:Huso horario#UTC−12:00, Y